Health effects of alcohol may refer to:

 Alcohol and health
 Alcohol intoxication
 Short-term effects of alcohol consumption
 Long-term effects of alcohol consumption
 Health effects of wine